Kazan National Research Technical University (KNRTU-KAI, full name in Russian: Казанский национальный исследовательский технический университет имени А. Н. Туполева, or Kazan National Research Technical University named after A.N. Tupolev) was established in 1932. The history of the university is closely related to the progress of Russian aeronautics. Until the recent time, it was well known as Kazan Aviation Institute (Казанский авиационный институт). In 1973, the institute was named after Andrei Nikolayevich Tupolev, the aircraft designer. In 1992, it got the status of the State Technical University.

Today the university is one of the leading Russian institutions in aircraft engineering, engine and instrument production, computer science and radio and telecommunications engineering. KNRTU-KAI is the largest technical university of the Republic of Tatarstan and the Volga region.

Kazan National Research Technical University teaches about 25,000 students on 65 majors in Engineering, Business and Humanitarian Sciences by the university faculty body of 1,800 persons, including 150 Full Professors & Doctor of Science degree holders, 600 Associate Professors & Ph.D. degree holders.

Education 
The university includes the following institutes and faculties:

 Institute of Aviation, Land Vehicles & Energetics
 Institute of Automation & Electronic Instrument-Making
 Institute of Technical Cybernetics & Informatics
 Institute of Radio-Engineering & Telecommunications
 Institute of Engineering & Economics
 Institute of Social Technologies
 Physics & Mathematics Faculty
 Institute of Business & Innovative Technologies

KNRTU-KAI includes 11 associated branch institutes outside Kazan in the towns of Almetyevsk, Chistopol, Leninogorsk, Naberezhnye Chelny, and Zelenodolsk.

On September 2, 2014, German-Russian Institute of Advanced Technologies (GRIAT) opened as a result of cooperation between the KNRTU-KAI and two universities in Germany - The Technische Universität Ilmenau (TU Ilmenau) and the Otto von Guericke University Magdeburg in Magdeburg.

Educational buildings 
The university is housed in eight buildings. It has six student dormitories and a hostel. A sports complex includes five indoor sports halls. The university also has a sports camp near to the Volga river, 40 km from Kazan.

Activities 
The sport complex includes 5 well-equipped indoor sports halls, swimming pool, as well as outdoor facilities for skiing & water sports.

Notable alumni
Diana Galimullina (born 1994), model

References

External links

1932 establishments in the Soviet Union
Aviation in the Soviet Union
 
National research universities in Russia
Recipients of the Order of Friendship of Peoples
Recipients of the Order of the Red Banner of Labour
Technical universities and colleges in Russia
Universities and institutes established in the Soviet Union
Universities in Kazan